Recetto is a comune (municipality) in the Province of Novara in the Italian region Piedmont, located about  northeast of Turin and about  west of Novara.

Recetto borders the following municipalities: Arborio, Biandrate, Greggio, San Nazzaro Sesia, and Vicolungo.

Demographic evolution

References

Cities and towns in Piedmont